David Verge Fleischer is an American-born Brazilian social scientist and professor.

Fleischer is professor emeritus at the University of Brasília, having taught there since 1972. He is also a visiting professor at the University of Washington and the State University of New York.

Fleischer works with the Brazilian NGOs Instituto Sociedade, População e Natureza (ISPN) and Transparência, Consciência e Cidadania (TCC-Brasil).

Fleischer, working with Robert G. Wesson, published the book Brazil in Transition in 1983, highlighting the events that led up to the 1964 Brazilian coup d'état.

External links
David Fleischer profile at Brazil Studies Program: David Rockefeller Center for Latin American Studies: Harvard University

Brazilian social scientists
American emigrants to Brazil
Living people
American sociologists
Year of birth missing (living people)